Roswolsky's Mistress is a 1921 German silent drama film directed by Felix Basch and starring Asta Nielsen, Paul Wegener, and Wilhelm Diegelmann. It was based on a novel by George Froeschel. The film was shot at the Tempelhof Studios in Berlin, with sets designed by art directors Robert Neppach and Jack Winter. According to one estimate, the star Asta Nielsen wore thirty six different costumes during the course of the film.

Plot
A working class girl is mistakenly believed to have become the mistress of a billionaire.

Cast
Asta Nielsen as Mary Verhag
Paul Wegener as Eugen Roswolsky
Wilhelm Diegelmann as secretary
Ferdinand von Alten as Lico Mussafin
Marga von Kierska as Fernande Raway
Guido Herzfeld as Flügelmann, moneylender
Arnold Korff as coroner
Carl Bayer as jeweller
Adolphe Engers as Jean Meyer
Ernst Gronau as Layton
Max Landa as Baron Albich
Adolf E. Licho as theater director
Maria Peterson as room landlord
Emil Rameau as bandmaster
Gertrud Wolle as Martha Verhag, Sister von Mary

References

Bibliography

External links

Films of the Weimar Republic
German drama films
German silent feature films
Films directed by Felix Basch
1921 drama films
Films based on Austrian novels
UFA GmbH films
Films shot at Tempelhof Studios
German black-and-white films
Silent drama films
1920s German films
1920s German-language films